John Colenback (October 8, 1935 – May 12, 2015) was an American actor. He was best known for portraying Dan Stewart on As the World Turns.

Early years
Colenback was born October 5, 1935, in Toledo, Ohio, the son of Mr. and Mrs. Lloyd Colenback. His father, an executive vice president with Toledo Scale Company, died when he was 12. John Colenback attended Ottaway Hills Elementary School and was in 17 theatrical productions as a student at Ottawa Hills High School and was named best actor at Dartmouth College during his senior year there.

Stage
Summer stock theatre led the way for Colenback's acting career. An agent spotted him at Bucks County Playhouse in Pennsylvania and persuaded him to try acting in New York. On Broadway, Colenback appeared in After the Rain (1967) and A Man for All Seasons (1961-1963). His obituary in Variety noted, "He starred in regional productions of The Importance of Being Earnest, The Halloween Bandit, Rosencrantz and Guildenstern Are Dead, As You Like It, and The Chinese Well and toured nationally in The Irregular Verb to Love.

Death
Colenback died in West Hollywood, California, of complications of  chronic obstructive pulmonary disease on May 12, 2015, at age 79.

References

External links

1935 births
2015 deaths
American male film actors
20th-century American male actors